Walton County is the name of two counties in the United States:

Walton County, Florida
Walton County, Georgia

Walton County can also refer to:

Walton County, Georgia (1803–1811), a former county of Georgia now part of North Carolina